Pan Zhongqi (潘忠岐) is a Chinese scholar, with a brief experience in Chinese diplomacy.  He is currently a professor at Fudan University in Shanghai.

Educational background
Pan was awarded his Ph.D. in international relations in 1999.  Post-doctoral studies provided experience in a variety of academic settings:
 University of Tokyo, visiting scholar, 1999–2000
 Henry L. Stimson Center, visiting scholar, 2001
 Harvard University, Fairbank Center for Chinese Studies, visiting scholar, 2004
 Lund University, visiting scholar, 2006
 Shanghai Institute for International Studies, research fellow, 2000-2005

Career
Pan is a professor at the School of International Relations and Public Affairs, which is located at Fudan University.

In 2008-2009, he was First Secretary at the  Mission of the People’s Republic of China to the European Communities.

Selected works
In a statistical overview derived from writings by and about Zhongqi Pan, OCLC/WorldCat encompasses roughly 7 works in 8 publications in 2 languages and 16 library holdings.

 世界秩序: 结构, 机制与模式 (World Order: Structure, Mechanisms, and Models), 2004
 多边治理与国际秩序 (Multilateral Governance and International Order), 2006
 国际责任与大国战略 (China’s International Responsibility and Strategy), 2008

 Journals
  "Managing the conceptual gap on sovereignty in China-EU relations,"  Asia Europe Journal (Germany), Vol. 8, No. 2 (2010): 227-243.
  "US Taiwan Policy of Strategic Ambiguity: a dilemma of deterrence," Journal of Contemporary China (UK), Vol. 12, No. 35 (2003): 387-407.
  "Sino-Japanese Dispute over the Diaoyu/Senkaku Islands: The Pending Controversy from the Chinese Perspective," Journal of Chinese Political Science (US), Vol. 12, No. 1 (2007): 71-92.

Notes

External links
 "Managing the Conceptual Gap on Sovereignty in China-EU Relations"

Living people
Date of birth unknown
Year of birth missing (living people)